Judy Hill Nelson is an American author best known for her 1983–1991 romance (while married) with and eventual palimony suit against women's tennis star Martina Navratilova.

Books 
After their break-up, Nelson was the author of the books Love Match: Nelson vs. Navratilova, chronicling her relationship with the tennis star, and Choices: My Journey After Leaving My Husband for Martina and a Lesbian Life, chronicling her coming out as a lesbian in the mid-1980s.

Personal life 
She is the mother of two sons.

References 

Living people
American lesbian writers
LGBT people from Texas
Writers from Texas
People from Fort Worth, Texas
Year of birth missing (living people)
21st-century American women writers
Martina Navratilova